Sedley may refer to:

Surname
Sedley (surname)

Given name
Sedley Alley (1955–2006), convicted of abducting, raping, and murdering 19-year-old Suzanne Marie Collins
Sedley Andrus, LVO (1915–2009), long-serving English officer of arms who was Beaumont Herald of Arms Extraordinary
Sedley Cooper (born 1911), former professional footballer
Sedley Cudmore, B.A., M.A., (1878–1945), Canadian economist, academic, civil servant and Canada's second Dominion Statistician

Places
Sedley, Indiana, an unincorporated community in Porter County, United States
Sedley, Saskatchewan, village in Saskatchewan, south-east of Regina, Saskatchewan, Canada
Sedley, Virginia, unincorporated community in the middle of Southampton County, Virginia, United States

Other
Sedley Baronets in the County of Kent, was created in the Baronetage of England on 29 June 1611
Sedley Place, independent design agency based in Clapham, London
Sedley Taylor Road, road in west Cambridge, England
Sedley, men's clothing brand based in England